Opisthostoma is a genus of minute land snails with opercula, terrestrial gastropod mollusks or micromollusks in the family Diplommatinidae.

Species
Species in the genus Opisthostoma include:

Opisthostoma sensu stricto

Synonyms
Plectostoma was treated as a subgenus of Opisthostoma. In a 2014 revision, Plectostoma is treated as a separate genus.

References

Further reading 
 Schilthuizen M., van Til A., Salverda M., Liew T.-S., James S. S., Elahan B. b. & Vermeulen J. J. (2006) "Microgeographic evolution of snail shell shape and predator behavior". Evolution 60(9): 1851-1858.

External links
 

Diplommatinidae
Taxonomy articles created by Polbot